Hlasivo is a municipality and village in Tábor District in the South Bohemian Region of the Czech Republic. It has about 100 inhabitants.

Administrative parts
Hamlets of Hlasívko, Rašovice and Temešvár are administrative parts of Hlasivo.

References

Villages in Tábor District